Route 371 is a highway in western Missouri. Its southern terminus is at Route 273 north of Tracy. Its northern terminus is at Interstate 29 Business (BL I-29) in St. Joseph. It is a former alignment of U.S. Route 71 (US 71).

Route description
Route 371 is a highway that begins in St. Joseph, Missouri and ends in Tracy, north of Platte City. It begins at an intersection with I-29 Business. It then goes south and has an interchange with I-229 and then has another interchange with Route 752. After this point, the highway stays mostly parallel and relatively close to I-29/US 71 It then intersects with Route H and shortly after Route DD. Northwest of Dearborn, it intersects with Route 116. Shortly after, it intersects with another Route H. Route H follows along the path of route 371 until after it reaches a town called New Market. Further south it intersects with Route U. It then intersects with Route 273 and shortly after ends at an interchange with I-29/US 71.

History

Major intersections

References

371
71-3
Transportation in Platte County, Missouri
Transportation in Buchanan County, Missouri
St. Joseph, Missouri metropolitan area